Mount Rainier may refer to
Mount Rainier, a stratovolcano southeast of Seattle, Washington
Mount Rainier National Park, which contains the volcano
Mount Rainier Wilderness, a designated wilderness area within Mount Rainier National Park
Mount Rainier Forest Reserve, a reserve now split between Mount Baker-Snoqualmie, Wenatchee and Gifford Pinchot National Forests
Mount Rainier Scenic Railroad, a railroad near the volcano
Mount Rainier Volcano Lahar Warning System, an emergency system designed to assist evacuation in case of an eruption
Mount Rainier (train), a former Amtrak train
Mount Rainier, Maryland, a town in the United States
Mount Rainier Historic District, a historic district located in Mount Rainier, Maryland
Mount Rainier High School, a school in Des Moines, Washington
Mount Rainier (packet writing), a technology for reading and writing CD-RWs, similar to the Universal Disk Format

See also 
 Rainier (disambiguation)